Moana is a 2009 Italian biographical dramatic miniseries directed by  Alfredo Peyretti.

The miniseries premiered at the 2009 Roma Fiction Fest, and was broadcast in two parts on 1 and 2 December of the same year on Sky Cinema.   Moana recounts the life of iconic Italian pornographic actress Moana Pozzi. Actress Ilona Staller sued the production for unauthorized use of the character "Cicciolina", of which she owned the rights; the case was eventually dismissed by the court.

Cast 
Violante Placido as Moana Pozzi
Fausto Paravidino as  Riccardo Schicchi
Gaetano Amato as  Pasquale
Michele Venitucci as  Antonio Di Ciesco
Giorgia Würth as  Cicciolina
Antonella Salvucci as  Ramba
Elena Bouryka as  Baby Pozzi

References

External links

2000s Italian-language films
Films about pornography
2009 biographical drama films
2009 television films
2009 films
Biographical films about entertainers
Biographical films about actors
Italian biographical drama films
Cultural depictions of pornographic film actors
Cultural depictions of Ilona Staller
2009 drama films